The Mokohinau skink (Oligosoma townsi), also known commonly as Towns' skink, is a species of lizard in the family Scincidae. The species is endemic to New Zealand.

Etymology
The specific name, townsi, is in honor of Kiwi herpetologist David Towns.

Geographic range
In New Zealand O. townsi is found in the Northland area including Three Kings Islands, the Poor Knights Islands, and other offshore islands.

Habitat
O. townsi occupies broadleaf forest and low scrub, usually amongst boulders and rock screes.

Reproduction and behaviour
O. townsi is viviparous and is believed to be nocturnal.

Description
O. townsi reaches a maximum body size of about  snout-vent length  (SVL).

References

Further reading
van Winkel D, Baling M, Hitchmough R (2019). Reptiles and Amphibians of New Zealand: A Field Guide. Auckland: Auckland University Press. 376 pp. .

Oligosoma
Reptiles described in 2008
Reptiles of New Zealand
Taxa named by David G. Chapple
Taxa named by Geoff B. Patterson
Taxa named by Charles H. Daugherty